In enzymology, a cis-1,2-dihydrobenzene-1,2-diol dehydrogenase is an enzyme that catalyzes the chemical reaction

cis-1,2-dihydrobenzene-1,2-diol + NAD+  catechol + NADH + H+

Thus, the two substrates of this enzyme are cis-1,2-dihydrobenzene-1,2-diol and NAD+, whereas its 3 products are catechol, NADH, and H+.

This enzyme belongs to the family of oxidoreductases, specifically those acting on the CH-CH group of donor with NAD+ or NADP+ as acceptor.  The systematic name of this enzyme class is cis-1,2-dihydrobenzene-1,2-diol:NAD+ oxidoreductase. Other names in common use include cis-benzene glycol dehydrogenase, cis-1,2-dihydrocyclohexa-3,5-diene (nicotinamide adenine, and dinucleotide) oxidoreductase.  This enzyme participates in 4 metabolic pathways: gamma-hexachlorocyclohexane degradation, toluene and xylene degradation, naphthalene and anthracene degradation, and styrene degradation.

References

 
 

EC 1.3.1
NADH-dependent enzymes
Enzymes of unknown structure